Metatelmatherium is a genus of brontothere found in North America and eastern Asia.

References

Brontotheres
Eocene odd-toed ungulates
Priabonian genus extinctions
Eocene mammals of Asia
Brontotheres of Asia